Camilo Romero (born 30 March 1970) is a Mexican former footballer who played as a left-back.

Romero was a member of the Mexico national football team competing at the 1992 Summer Olympics in Barcelona, Spain. He earned fourteen caps for the national A-side, making his debut on February 1, 1995, in a friendly match against Uruguay (1-0 win) in San Diego.

References

FIFA

1970 births
Living people
Mexico international footballers
Association football defenders
Olympic footballers of Mexico
Footballers at the 1992 Summer Olympics
C.D. Guadalajara footballers
C.F. Pachuca players
Querétaro F.C. footballers
Club Puebla players
Liga MX players
Club León footballers
Atlético Morelia players
Lagartos de Tabasco footballers
1997 Copa América players
Footballers from Guadalajara, Jalisco
Toros Neza footballers
Mexican footballers
Pan American Games medalists in football
Pan American Games silver medalists for Mexico
Footballers at the 1991 Pan American Games
Medalists at the 1991 Pan American Games